Bruce Turkel (born 1957) is a creative entrepreneur, speaker and author on the subject of branding.

Early life
Bruce was born and raised in Miami Beach, Florida. His father, Leonard Turkel and his mother, Annsheila Turkel moved to Miami from New York City in 1956. He attended the University of Florida from 1976 to 1980 where he earned degrees in Fine Arts and Design.

Career

He began his advertising career in New York in 1980, but due to his entrepreneurial drive, which was influenced by his father, Bruce returned to Miami in 1983 and founded Turkel Brands, the branding and advertising agency he now heads.

Bruce is also a founder and board member of The Strategic Forum (TSF). TSF is a South Florida-based executive organization dedicated to creating business opportunities for its c-suite members as well as students from Nova Southeastern University's. Wayne Huizenga College of Business and Entrepreneurship.

Bruce is also a professional speaker and author. He has written and published three books on branding and marketing, Brain Darts, New Design: Miami, and Building Brand Value and one novel, The Mouth of the South, A member of the National Speakers Association, he has spoken for Fortune 500 companies including Nike, Toll Brothers and Discovery Channel, at conferences such as Destination Marketing Association International, NAMM, MPI, and ProMax and at universities including MIT and Harvard.

He has been interviewed on CNN and NPR. He is a regular guest subject matter expert on Fox Business Channel and has been featured in The New York Times , The Miami Herald, and Fortune.

Books
Brain darts : the advertising design of Turkel Schwartz & Partners(1999). Rockport Publ. . .
New Design: Miami. (2000) Rockport Pub. .
Building brand value : seven simple steps to profitable communications. (2005) BookSurge Publishing. .
The Mouth of the South. (2011)
All About Them: Grow Your Business by Focusing on Others. (2016) Brilliance Audio Lib Edn. .

References

External links 
 Bruce Turkel
 Together With Turkel
  Is That All There Is Community Forum

Businesspeople from Miami
Living people
American advertising executives
University of Florida alumni
1957 births